Silverton Siege is a South African film directed by Mandla Dube. It is based on the real life siege that took place in Silverton, Pretoria in 1980. The film was released internationally on Netflix on 27 April 2022.

According to African Folder, one of the film's strengths is the performances of its three leads, Calvin, Aldo, and Terra. The actors give their characters depth and nuance, making them feel like real people with complex motivations and emotions. Their performances are especially noteworthy during the tense standoff at the national bank, where they convey their characters' fear, desperation, and determination with intensity and authenticity.

Plot 
A trio of anti-apartheid freedom fighters, take hostage of a local bank within Silverton, demanding the release of South African activist Nelson Mandela.

Cast

Production
The film had officially been in development for two years as of 2019. Upon reading about the real life Silverton Siege of 1980, Dube became inspired and began developing a script with fellow American Film Institute alumnus Sechaba Morojele as editor. Dube said the film would be about 60% factual, and that they would use creative license for the rest, wanting to make it "an entertaining story, not a documentary". Principal photography took place on location in Pretoria. Production received funding from the National Film & Video Foundation.

The cast was announced alongside the release date announcement in March 2022; Thabo Rametsi, Noxolo Dlamini, and Stefan Erasmus would star as the Silverton trio alongside Arnold Vosloo, Tumisho Masha, Michelle Mosalakae, and Elani Dekker.

Reception 
On review website Rotten Tomatoes, the film holds an approval rating of 75% based on 8 reviews, with an average rating of 5.9/10.

References

External links
 
 
 
 
 Silverton Siege - a short overview of the actual Silverton Siege, 1980

2022 films
Action films based on actual events
Apartheid films
English-language Netflix original films
Films set in 1980
Films shot in Gauteng
Films set in South Africa
Siege films
Thriller films based on actual events
2020s English-language films
South African action thriller films